The 2022–23 Denmark Series is the 58th season of the Denmark Series, the fifth tier of the Danish football league structure organised by the Danish FA (DBU). The season marked a transitional phase in the structure of the Danish leagues.

This season, the league was divided into four groups of ten teams each. After the regular season (27 rounds), the top four teams in the four groups are promoted for a spot in the 2023–24 Danish 3rd Division, the relegation for this season is based on which four team is relegated from the 2022–23 Danish 3rd Division depending on the teams are from east or west of the Great Belt.

Regular Groups

Group 1 (Copenhagen/Zealand)

Group 2 (Copenhagen/Zealand)

Group 3 (Southern Jutland/Funen)

Group 4 (Northern Jutland)

Promotion rounde 
The top two teams in the four groups are promoted for a spot in the Promotion round where the four top team carry over 3 points. There play for three spots in the 2023–24 Danish 3rd Division

Relegation Round 
Eight teams are relegated for the 2023-24 season to the tier 6 level.

Group 1 Relegation (Copenhagen/Zealand)

Group 2 Relegation (Copenhagen/Zealand)

Group 3 Relegation (Southern Jutland/Funen) 
<onlyinclude>

Group 4 Relegation (Northern Jutland)
<onlyinclude>

5
Denmark Series
Denmark Series seasons